Robert E. Witt (born September 16, 1940) is an American businessman, and academic administrator. He is the current Chancellor of the University of Alabama System, concurrently serving as the Chairman of the Council of Presidents of Alabama’s public colleges and universities.

Early life and education
Witt received his bachelor's degree in economics in 1962 from Bates College, his M.B.A. from the Tuck School of Business at Dartmouth College and his Ph.D. from Pennsylvania State University. He is also a member of the Phi Delta Theta Fraternity.

Academic career

University of Texas at Austin
Witt joined the business school faculty at the University of Texas at Austin in 1968, and rose through the ranks as chair and associate dean. He was named the Zale Corporation Centennial Professor in Business in 1983. Two years later he was named to the Mortimer Centennial Professorship in Business and that year became acting dean of business. In 1985, he was named dean, a position he would hold for nine years.

University of Texas at Arlington
In 1995, Witt joined the University of Texas at Arlington as interim president. He was named permanent president in 1996. His accomplishments at UT-Arlington included:

 Partnering with the Chamber of Commerce to establish the Arlington Technology Incubator
 Creating a nanotechnology research and teaching facility
 Establishing the University's first alliance of African-American ministers and community leaders.

University of Alabama
In 2003, Witt left the University of Texas at Arlington to become President of the University of Alabama. On May 5, 2012, Witt was appointed as the Chancellor of the University of Alabama System.

Honors 
Witt was awarded an honorary degree from Bates College, in Lewiston, Maine on May 29, 2016.

References

1940 births
Living people
American Episcopalians
Bates College alumni
Pennsylvania State University alumni
Presidents of the University of Alabama
Presidents of the University of Texas at Arlington
Tuck School of Business alumni
University of Texas at Austin faculty
Chancellors of the University of Alabama System
Businesspeople from Bridgeport, Connecticut
People from Bridgeport, Connecticut
Business school deans
American university and college faculty deans